The Old Customs House, also called the Old Post Office, is a historic building located at the corner of Clinch Avenue and Market Street in Knoxville, Tennessee, United States. Completed in 1874, it was the city's first federal building. It housed the federal courts, excise offices and post office until 1933.  From 1936 to 1976, it was used by the Tennessee Valley Authority for offices. Expanded in 2004, the building is home to the East Tennessee History Center, which includes the Lawson McGhee Library's Calvin M. McClung Historical Collection, the Knox County Archives, and the East Tennessee Historical Society's headquarters and museum. The building is listed on the National Register of Historic Places for its architectural significance.

Design

The Old Customs House is a three-story Italianate style building sheathed in East Tennessee marble.  The smooth exterior walls contrast with rusticated quoins at the building's corners.  The former courtroom on the third floor is notable for its neoclassical detailing.  Much of the original interior has been altered.

History

The Customs House is situated on what was originally Lot 11 of James White's 1795 extension of Knoxville. An 1871 map of Knoxville shows the property as an open grove surrounded by a few small houses.

Through the 1850s, Congress was petitioned by cities across the country to provide courtrooms and post offices.

Congress appropriated funding for Knoxville's Customs House in 1856, and reappropriated the funding in 1869. Construction of the original portion of the Customs House (at the corner of Clinch and Market), designed by U.S. government chief architect Alfred B. Mullett (1834–1890), began in 1871 and was completed in 1874. The first floor was used as a post office, while the second and third floors were used for the federal court and office space for federal officials.

As Knoxville's population quadrupled in the late 19th century, the increased postal activity left the Customs House critically overcrowded, and the building was enlarged in 1910. The building had a steam plant for heating and used electricity provided by the Knoxville Railway & Light Company.

Knoxville's continued growth rendered the Customs House insufficient for the city's postal needs, and a new post office was built on Main Street in 1934.  Ownership of the Customs House was transferred to the Tennessee Valley Authority. In 1976, ownership of the Customs House was transferred to Knox County for use by the Lawson McGhee Library's Calvin M. McClung Historical Collection and the Knox County Archives.

In the 1980s, the East Tennessee Historical Society (ETHS) moved to the Customs House and set up the East Tennessee Historical Center.  The society opened the Museum of East Tennessee History in 1993.  In 2000, the second-floor corridor of the building was named Deaderick Hall in honor of librarian Lucile Deaderick (1914–2006).

In 2004, a BarberMcMurry-designed eastern extension to the Customs House was completed, extending the structure the length of Clinch Avenue from Market to Gay Street. This new complex, known as the East Tennessee History Center, includes the ETHS's headquarters, the Museum of East Tennessee History, the Calvin M. McClung Historical Collection, and the Knox County Archives. The Old Customs House is depicted in the ETHS logo.

See also
Fidelity Building (Knoxville)
Greystone (Knoxville)
Knox County Courthouse (Tennessee)
Old City Hall (Knoxville)

Notes

Sources
 Isenhour, Judith Clayton.  Knoxville - A Pictorial History. (Donning, 1978), pages 122-124.
 Knoxville: Fifty Landmarks. (Knoxville: The Knoxville Heritage Committee of the Junior League of Knoxville, 1976), page 11.

External links

 East Tennessee Historical Society
 MPC Silver Award Photos
 Custom House under construction, circa 1872 – photograph on file at the Calvin M. McClung Digital Collection
 Custom House interior, circa 1894 – photograph on file at the Calvin M. McClung Digital Collection

Government buildings completed in 1874
Buildings and structures in Knoxville, Tennessee
Renaissance Revival architecture in Tennessee
Alfred B. Mullett buildings
Custom houses in the United States
Government buildings on the National Register of Historic Places in Tennessee
Post office buildings on the National Register of Historic Places in Tennessee
Courthouses in Tennessee
Former federal courthouses in the United States
National Register of Historic Places in Knoxville, Tennessee
Custom houses on the National Register of Historic Places